Cryptophlebia peltastica is a moth of the  family Tortricidae. It is found throughout Africa from Ghana to South Africa and Eritrea, including islands of the Indian Ocean and is also known from Asia (Saudi Arabia, Indonesia), the Pacific region (Guam) and from the Bahamas.

This species is one of the main pests of Litchi chinensis, a (Sapindaceae). but the larvae have also been found on Nephelium sp.,  Mimosoideae (Parkia clappertoniana), and many Fabaceae species (Bauhinia sp., Canavalia ensiformis, Ceratonia siliqua, Poinciana regia, Tamarindus indica, Xenocarpus granatum, Cassia sp. and Feronia sp.).

References

External links

Africanmoths: Distribution map & pictures of Cryptophlebia peltastica

Grapholitini
Moths of Africa
Moths of Madagascar
Moths of Mauritius
Moths of Réunion
Moths of Seychelles
Moths described in 1921